This is an article about the J Dilla album. For the Trick-Trick song of the same name, see Welcome 2 Detroit (song).

Welcome 2 Detroit is the debut studio album by American hip hop recording artist J Dilla, released on February 26, 2001. The album followed his group Slum Village's critically acclaimed Fantastic, Vol. 2, and kicked off BBE's "Beat Generation" series (producer-driven albums).

Welcome 2 Detroit bears the name "Jay Dee" as well as "J Dilla", and marks the first time Dilla (who until that point was still known as Jay Dee) officially used the name J Dilla.

Overview
Welcome 2 Detroit is a showcase of the talent from J Dilla's hometown, introducing a pre-Slum Village Elzhi on the song "Come Get It", and making room for his longtime 1st Down partner Phat Kat on the appropriately titled "Featuring Phat Kat".

The album sound ranges from grimy hardcore hip hop ("Pause") to electronic psychedelia ("B.B.E."). The track "Rico Suave Bossa Nova" is inspired by Brazilian music group Azymuth. As Dilla mentions in the extensive liner notes:

J Dilla covers Donald Byrd's "Think Twice", singing the lead vocals.

On "African Rhythms", J Dilla covers the Afro beat group Plunky & the Oneness of Juju's song of the same name, replaying all the instruments as well as mimicking the spoken introduction.

On the albums outro "One", J Dilla takes a moment to thank all who have helped him in the hip-hop industry, including Slum Village, Q-Tip and De La Soul. The Pop band 'N Sync is also mentioned. An instrumental version of the album was released on August 23, 2005.

Track listing
All tracks produced by J Dilla except "The Clapper" which is produced by Karriem Riggins and co-produced by J Dilla.

 "Welcome 2 Detroit" – 0:49
 "Y'all Ain't Ready"  – 1:28
 "Think Twice" (Feat. Dwele)  – 3:52
 "The Clapper" (Feat. Blu) – 2:06
 "Come Get It" (Feat. Elzhi)  – 5:02
 "Pause" (Feat. Frank-N-Dank)  – 2:45
 "B.B.E. (Big Booty Express)"  – 2:12
 "Beej-N-Dem Pt. 2" (Feat. Beej)  – 2:49
 "Brazilian Groove" (EWF)  – 1:30
 "It's Like That" (Feat. Hodge Podge (Big Tone) and Lacks (Ta'Raach) )  – 4:05
 "Give It Up"  – 3:08
 "Rico Suave Bossa Nova"  – 1:25
 "Featuring Phat Kat" (Feat. Phat Kat)  – 3:43
 "Shake It Down"  – 2:55
 "African Rhythms"  – 1:36
 "One"  – 1:30
Welcome 2 Detroit - The 20th Anniversary Edition

This edition was released on February 5, 2021 on the BBE label, containing the original 16 tracks, with instrumentals, bonus mixes, beats and alternate takes.

Album singles

Personnel
James Yancey - rap, vocals, instruments, production
Karriem Riggins - drums, percussion, production
Dwele Gardner - keyboards, trumpet, bass guitar, fender rhodes
Antwan Gardner - trombone
Frank Bush - rap, claves
Derrick Harvey - rap
Jason Powers - rap
Ronnie Watts - rap
Anthony Jackson - rap
Terrell McMathis - rap
Blu - rap
Beej - rap

Recording
Recorded at Pay-Jay Studios, Studio A, Dearborn
Engineered by James Yancey and Todd Fairall
All songs mixed by James Yancey and Todd Fairall at Studio A, Dearborn.
Mastered by Shawn Joseph, Optimum Mastering
Executive producers: Peter Adarkwah and James Yancey
Co-executive producer: Timotheous Entertainment
Art Direction and Design: Thomas Mc Callion

References

External links
 Welcome 2 Detroit at Discogs

2001 albums
J Dilla albums
Albums produced by J Dilla
Albums produced by Karriem Riggins
Barely Breaking Even albums